Fraggle Rock: The Animated Series is an American animated children's television series based on the original live-action version of the same name created by Jim Henson. NBC aired this spin-off program on Saturday mornings at 10:00 AM (later moved to 11:00 AM) for one season during 1987. It was later shown in reruns on Disney Channel from May 5, 1990 to June 1995.

Synopsis
The animated series followed the same formula as the HBO original live-action series, including the same theme song but re-recorded with the cartoon character voice actors. Many episodes consisted of two 15-minute stories; however, a few presented a single full 30-minute plot. The animated version carried on the tradition of original songs, with at least one tune per episode (including a few recycled from the puppet version, such as "Let Me Be Your Song").

In its original run, the animated episodes were bookended by footage of the original puppet version of Uncle Traveling Matt, introducing the show from Doc's workshop. The animated version of Fraggle Rock consisted of 13 episodes.

The most noticeable difference is that, unlike the live-action version, the animated version of Doc is shown from the neck down, much like Nanny on Muppet Babies.

Characters

Episodes

Voice cast
 Bob Bergen as Wembley Fraggle, Additional Voices
 Townsend Coleman as Gobo Fraggle, Wrench Doozer, Architect Doozer, Additional Voices
 Barbara Goodson as Red Fraggle, Wingnut Doozer, Additional Voices
 Michael Laskin as Junior Gorg
 Mona Marshall as Mokey Fraggle, Cotterpin Doozer, Additional Voices
 Patti Parris as Ma Gorg, Additional Voices
 Rob Paulsen as Boober Fraggle, Additional Voices
 Patrick Pinney as Uncle Traveling Matt, Pa Gorg, Flange Doozer, Additional Voices
 Stu Rosen as Storyteller Fraggle
 John Stephenson as Jerome "Doc" Crystal, Philo, Gunge, Additional Voices
 Dave Goelz as Uncle Traveling Matt (live-action puppet version only)

Crew
 John Semper and Cynthia Friedlob - Head Writers / Showrunners
 Stu Rosen - Voice Director

Home media
The series was released on VHS in the UK by Palace Video. Two tapes were released, each featuring two full episodes. The first two episodes were released in the UK on a single-disc DVD titled "Dance Your Cares Away!" by HIT Entertainment in 2005.

The show's first US home media release was on January 19, 2010, when Lionsgate Home Entertainment released the complete series on a two-disc set. On July 11, 2018, Sony Pictures Home Entertainment announced a 12-disc complete series Blu-ray set of the main Fraggle Rock series with all 13 episodes of the animated series to be included as well. It was released on September 25, 2018. They also released a separate 2-disc set of the animated series on the same day.

References

External links

Fraggle Rock
1987 American television series debuts
1987 American television series endings
1980s American animated television series
American animated television spin-offs
American children's animated adventure television series
American children's animated comedy television series
American children's animated fantasy television series
English-language television shows
NBC original programming
Television series by The Jim Henson Company
Television series by Marvel Productions